NFPA may refer to: 

 National Fire Protection Association
 NFPA 704, National Fire Protection Association Fire Diamond
 National Food Processors Association
 National Fluid Power Association
 Non-Fossil Purchasing Agency
Non-functioning pituitary adenoma